The Chennai Rainbow Pride March has been held by members of Tamil Nadu LGBTIQA+ communities every June since 2009. The pride march is organised under the banner Tamil Nadu Rainbow Coalition (earlier under the banner Chennai Rainbow Coalition until 2013), which is a collective of LGBT individuals, supporters, and organizations working on human rights and healthcare for the LGBTQIA community. The Pride March occurs on the final Sunday of June every year. The Pride March is usually preceded by a month-long series of events organized by NGOs and organizations to inculcate awareness and support for the LGBTQ community, such as panel discussions, film screenings, and cultural performances. The Chennai Vaanavil Suyamariyadhai Perani a.k.a. Chennai Rainbow Self-Respect March is known for being inter-sectional in nature as it addresses issues with multiple axes such as caste, class, religion coupled with gender discrimination.

The march took place at Marina Beach from 2009-2011, and Elliot's Beach, Besant Nagar in 2012. Since 2013, the venue has been Egmore, beginning at Rajarathinam Stadium. The Chennai Pride is the only Indian pride march whose pride march coincides with the global Pride Month, which is celebrated annually in June.

History

2009 
Chennai held its very first queer pride march on 28 June 2009. The March happened at the Marina Beach; from the Triumph of Labour Statue to the Mahatma Gandhi Statue. The slogan of the march was taken from the words of the Tamil poet Bharatiyar: "Hues may vary, but humanity does not." (Tamil: வண்ணங்கள வேற்றுமைப்பட்டால், அதில் மானுடர் வேற்றுமையில்லை). The march demanded that parents of LGBT youth and healthcare facilitators stop inhumane practices like "conversion therapy". It also demanded that HIV testing follow national government protocols of pre-test counseling, post-test counseling, and respecting the confidentiality of client.

The police were reluctant to grant permission for the Pride March. Permission was finally granted when the police were told that the parade was being held to thank Ms Kanimozhi, a  DMK politician, for helping start the Transgender Welfare Board in the state (a Board that has since remained inactive since the opposition party AIADMK came to power).

Around 200 people from the LGBT community along with their family and friends formed the core group for the march. There were prominent figures from the community such as Kalki Subramaniam, a trans woman who runs the Sahodari Foundation and the TV anchor Rose Venkatesan, also a trans woman. Many others joined in at various points during the evening, with posters and slogans denouncing Section 377 of the IPC.

The preceding week also saw a lot of several events in the run-up to the Pride March. There were cultural performances, panel discussions on the colonial construction of the Section 377 law, a film screening of the Oscar-winning film Milk, and also a support group for parents and siblings of LGBTQ individuals.

2010 
The 2010 Pride March was held on 27 June 2010. It was preceded by a month-long series of events, including a debate on homosexuality and family values; an LGBT performance festival; a poetry reading event; a meeting of parents of LGBT people; art, slogan, placard and beauty contests; and film screenings. The 2010 Pride march celebrated the landmark judgment by the Delhi High Court that read down Section 377 (which was unfortunately reversed by the Supreme Court in 2013). It also called for an end to bigotry and violence against the LGBTQ community and lamented the loss of Prof. Shrinivas Ramachandra Siras. It demanded that hijras and other transgender communities in India be recorded in the 2011 national census in the category corresponding to their gender of choice, and not limited by the currently available binary choices of 'male' and 'female'. It also called for affordable and appropriate healthcare, the stop of unscientific  as well as sensitive and inclusive media reportage.

The march began at the Triumph of Labour statue at the Marina Beach and ended at the Lighthouse, and saw about 300 participants.

2011 
The 2011 Pride March was held on 26 June 2011. It saw over 300 members of the LGBTQ community along with their friends and family march on Marina Beach. The march was the culmination of a month-long series of events including panel discussions, sensitisation programmes, groups meetings and film screenings highlighting the concerns of the LGBT community, which were organised by several NGOS. The participants emphasised the need for the Supreme Court to uphold the 2009 Delhi High Court that struck down Section 377.

2012 
The 2012 Pride March was held on 24 June 2012 on Elliots's Beach Road, Besant Nagar. As in past years, it used the words of the Tamil poet Thiruvalluvar as its rallying cry: "Can love be shackled?" (Tamil: அன்பிற்கும் உண்டோ அடைக்குந்தாழ்?) Just like the previous years, the March was preceded by activities over the entire month of June such as panel discussions, a three-day film festival, cultural performances in honour of LGBTQ individuals who had lost their lives, as well as poster and placard making sessions.

The March called upon the Supreme Court to uphold the 2009 Delhi High Court that struck down Section 377. It commended the policy decisions of the government in its inclusion of the LGBTQ population in its drafting of the 12th National Five Year Plan. It also requested that the Tamil Nadu government continue and build on the work of the Aravani Welfare Board that was instituted for the welfare of the trans woman community. Like other years, it called for an end to violence and discrimination against LGBTQ people in healthcare and educational institutions, as well as within the family, and in representation in the media.

2012 was also the first time that the Pride March saw the inclusion and support of corporate bodies and companies. However, the organizers maintained that they did not accept donations from the corporate bodies as they wanted to keep the March free from corporate influence.

2013 
The 2013 Pride march was Chennai's fifth Pride March and held on 29 June 2013. This time, the venue was shifted to Egmore, from Rajarathinam Stadium to Langs Garden Road, as police permission for protests was only available at this venue, and not at Marina or Besant Nagar beaches. The march still saw a participation of about 350 people. One of the new demands in 2013 was to extend the services of the transgender welfare board to all sexual minorities. There was also a long-pending demand raised for the clarity in inheritance laws.

The March saw some opposition. At the venue, a group of twelve people, who called themselves ‘Members of Christian Fellowship,’ held banners opposing homosexuality and distributed copies of the New Testament. However, the march went on as planned.

The run-up to the March included cultural performances, film festivals, sensitisation workshops, parents meets and panel discussions on workplace diversity over the month of June.

2014 
The 2014 Pride march was held on 29 June 2014. The march celebrated the historic NALSA judgment, in which the Supreme Court recognised the rights of the transgender community, and lamented the Supreme Court's 2013 judgment that overturned the 2009 judgment by the Delhi High Court Court which had struck down Section 377. The "Tamil Nadu Rainbow Coalition" held cultural programmes, seminars, film screening and parents' meet as part of the run-up to the pride.

2015 
Starting from Rajarathinam Stadium, Egmore to Mahatma Gandhi Road, Nungambakkam, the Chennai Pride March 2015 was held on 28 June 2015. The month long celebrations also saw plays by a theatre group, panel discussions, a story-telling workshop, film festival and a panel discussion, "Society and LGBT Community-building bridges".

2016 
Taking the same route as the previous year, the Chennai Pride March was held on 26 June 2016. The main focus of the year were just two demands – equal rights and dismissal of Section 377. The March saw about 600-odd members who walked about 2.5 km and also observed silence for the Orlando killings.

2017 
The ninth Chennai Rainbow Pride March was held on 25 June 2017. The March culminated a month-long series of events for Pride Month, including sensitization programmes on sexuality and gender-identity, cultural performances,  health information talks, solidarity events, films and poster making sessions. The Chennai Pride held a special focus on intersectionality, with its posters and press release raising issues against Hindi imposition in South India, Hindutva politics, and cultural erasure. Its press release stated that it stood in "solidarity with the Dalit community, people with disability, farmers, sex workers of all genders, other minorities, women, and all others struggling against oppression."

The March saw some controversy when some corporate organisations attempted to distribute branded merchandise, which is not allowed by the Chennai Pride organisers. The Chennai Pride has strict guidelines about corporate sponsorship – employees are allowed to wear clothing with their company's brand or logo, but are not allowed to have any sort of branding in their placards or distribute marketing merchandise. The Pride March organisers confiscated the branding material.

2018 
The 2018 Chennai Rainbow Pride March celebrated ten years of Chennai Rainbow Pride, and was held on 24 June 2018. The Pride followed the same route as the previous year, that commenced at Rajarathinam Stadium in Egmore  and ended at Albert theatre via Langes garden road. The decadal celebration of the 'Chennai Vaanavil Suyamariyadhai Perani' a.k.a. 'Chennai Rainbow Self-Respect march' witnessed around 700 members of different genders and sexualities marching, dancing and raising slogans this year.

A wide range of topics including sex work, marital rape, institutionalized discrimination were discussed. They demanded stringent implementation of the 2014 NALSA National Legal Services Authority v. Union of India judgement which includes legal recognition for person's transition within the male and female spectrum, social welfare schemes, better healthcare facilities, etc.

As with previous years, the Pride March demanded that the Supreme Court reverse the Koushal judgment of 11 December 2013, which had reversed the 2009 Delhi High Court's reading down of Section 377. The March opposed the contentious Transgender Persons (Protection of Rights) Bill 2016, seeking instead a bill that complied with the 2014 NALSA Judgment which ensured the rights of transgender persons in India. The press release also stated its usual demands of access to stigma-free healthcare, discrimination-free workplaces, LGBTIQA+ inclusive counselling services in educational institutions and workplace, formation of support groups and reservation for transgender people in educational institutions.

See also 
 Tamil Sexual Minorities

References 

LGBT culture in Chennai
Pride parades in India
2009 establishments in Tamil Nadu
Recurring events established in 2009
Events in Chennai